Gloire was a French light cruiser of the .

Design and description
The La Galissonnière class was designed as an enlarged and improved version of the preceding . Their crew consisted of 557 men in peacetime and 612 in wartime.

Construction and career
After completing trials, Gloire arrived in Brest on 18 November 1937, then left for French Indochina on 1 December, returning to Brest on 16 April 1938. Gloire joined the 4th Cruiser Division in January 1939, with which she visited Britain and the United States. She was refitted between October and December 1939. She then sailed for Canada with the battleship , carrying gold, and subsequently escorted a Canadian troop convoy on her return. Atlantic patrols as part of Vice Admiral Marcel-Bruno Gensoul's Force de Raid followed. At the time of the French surrender in June 1940, Gloire was at Algiers, but returned to Toulon on 4 July, where the 4th Cruiser Division formed part of the French Independent Naval Force.

Gloire initially stayed loyal to the Vichy French government. On 18 September the 4th Cruiser Division sailed for Libreville, French Equatorial Africa. They were intercepted by British forces.

Between April and July, Gloire underwent a refit at Casablanca, and on 12 September 1942 took part in the rescue operations after the passenger liner  had been sunk, arriving on the scene in the evening of 17 September.

After the Allied invasion of north Africa (Operation Torch) and the consequent abrogation by the Germans of the armistice (Case Anton) in November 1942, Gloire rejoined the Allies. Three surviving La Galissonnière-class cruisers, based at Dakar, were refitted in 1943. Unlike her sisters which were refitted at Philadelphia, instead she was refitted at New York. removing aircraft installations and adding light anti-aircraft weapons. Gloire then operated from Dakar together with other French and Italian cruisers, searching for Axis blockade runners in the central and south Atlantic until 16 January 1944, when she moved to the Mediterranean.

In February, she supported the Allied landings at Anzio, bombarding enemy positions in the Bay of Gaeta (firing 604 rounds) and transporting troops to Italy and Corsica. After a refit at Algiers between 27 April and 17 June, she participated in the landing in the south of France (Operation Dragoon) in August, firing nearly 2,000 rounds in shore support between 15 and 28 August. Gloire continued to support Allied forces along the French and Italian Rivieras until the end of the war, except for a special trip to the United States in December.

Postwar, Gloire made three deployments to Indo-China and she was finally placed in reserve on 1 February 1955, being condemned for disposal on 2 January 1958.

Sources and references

Bibliography

  

La Galissonnière-class cruisers
World War II cruisers of France
Ships of the Free French Naval Forces
Ships built in France
1935 ships